Anna Wood may refer to:

Anna Wood (born 1980) (1980–1995), died after taking an MDMA tablet at a dance party
Anna Wood (kayaker) (born 1966), Australian flatwater canoeist
Anna Wood (actress) (born 1985), American actress
Anna Lomax Wood (born 1944), American anthropologist
Anna Cogswell Wood (1850–1940), American writer, art collector and teacher

See also 
Ann Wood (disambiguation)